The City of Las Vegas was a streamlined passenger train operated by the Union Pacific Railroad between Las Vegas, Nevada and Los Angeles, California. It operated from 1956 to 1968. It was one of several trains to operate with the experimental General Motors Aerotrain, although this experiment was short-lived. After 1961 the train was known as the Las Vegas Holiday Special.

History 
The Union Pacific introduced the City of Las Vegas on December 18, 1956. The service initially used General Motors' experimental Aerotrain trainset, but the Union Pacific ended their lease within a year due to maintenance and performance problems including needing a helper engine to climb Cajon Pass. The train continued with standard streamlined cars in UP's Armour Yellow paint, leaving Los Angeles in the morning and returning in the evening.

On September 24, 1961, the name was changed to Las Vegas Holiday Special, when the consist and frequency were reduced. Service ended altogether on June 15, 1968.

Equipment

The GM Aerotrain included nine cars: three 40-seat coaches, a bar-lounge, a "Chuck Wagon" buffet, three more 40-seat coaches, a 36-seat coach. The Union Pacific replaced the Aerotrain with conventional equipment on September 15, 1957. The new eight-car consist included a mail car, two 48-seat coaches, a lunch counter-dinette, a "Pub" buffet-lounge, and three more 48-seat coaches. These cars were drawn from a variety of sources. The coaches were built by Pullman-Standard in 1942 for the San Francisco Overland Limited. The lunch-counter dinette was part of a set of four (numbered 4000–4003) built by American Car and Foundry for the City of St. Louis in 1951. The dinette portion seated 16 while the counter area seated 21 along a -long countertop. The "Pub" was originally coach #5201, part of a set of twelve (5200-5211) built by Pullman-Standard for the Challenger in 1937.

See also
 Passenger train service on the Union Pacific Railroad

References

Further reading 
 Kawala, Dana. (2006). "8 pike-size passenger trains: Union Pacific trains 115 and 116." Model Railroader 73 (3) 65.

Passenger trains of the Union Pacific Railroad
Named passenger trains of the United States
Railway services introduced in 1956
Railway services discontinued in 1968